Douglas N. Husak is an American legal philosopher, academic and author. He is a Distinguished Professor of Philosophy and co-directs the Institute for Law and Philosophy at Rutgers University.

Husak has authored over 100 scholarly articles and 6 books. He has conducted research on the intersection between moral philosophy and the substantive criminal law, focusing especially on criminalization decisions and the moral limits of the criminal sanction. Husak’s books include The Philosophy of Criminal Law: Selected Essays,  Overcriminalization: The Limits of the Criminal Law,  Legalize This! The Case for Decriminalizing Drugs,  Drugs and Rights,  and Ignorance of Law.

Education
Husak completed his Bachelors and graduated from Denison University in 1970. He then studied at Ohio State University and received his Doctoral and Juris Doctor Degrees in 1976.

Career
Husak joined Rutgers University Department of Philosophy in 1977. In 2000, he was promoted as Professor II of Philosophy. At Rutgers University, Husak directs the M.A. Program in Law and Philosophy and is the Co-Director of the Institute for Law and Philosophy.

Husak’s research is focused on all aspects of legal philosophy, especially on decisions regarding criminalization and the moral limits of the criminal sanction. He has also conducted research on the rationale for drug prohibitions.

Husak is the former Editor-in-Chief of both Criminal Law and Philosophy and Law and Philosophy.

Husak has been a visiting professor of fellow in New York University, Cambridge University, University College London, Hebrew University of Jerusalem, Fordham University and University of Michigan, among others.

Bibliography

Books
Drugs and Rights (1992) 
Legalize This!: The Case for Decriminalizing Drugs (2002) 
The Legalization of Drugs (For and Against) (2005) 
Overcriminalization: The Limits of the Criminal Law (2008) 
The Philosophy of Criminal Law: Selected Essays (2010) 
Ignorance of Law: A Philosophical Inquiry (2016)

Selected articles
Husak, D. N., & Callender, C. A. (1994). Wilful ignorance, knowledge, and the equal culpability thesis: A study of the deeper significance of the principle of legality. Wisconsin Law Review., 29.
Husak, D. N. (1992). Why punish the deserving?. Nous, 26(4), 447-464.
Husak, D. N. (1995). The nature and justifiability of nonconsummate offenses. Arizona Law Review, 37, 151.
Husak, D. N., & Thomas, G. C. (1992). Date rape, social convention, and reasonable mistakes. Law and Philosophy, 11(1-2), 95-126.
Husak, D.N. (2020).  The Price of Criminal Law Skepticism: Ten Functions of the Criminal Law. New Journal of Criminal Law 27-59.

References 

Living people
Denison University alumni
Ohio State University Moritz College of Law alumni
Rutgers University
1948 births
20th-century American philosophers